Nightrunner or variant may refer to:

 The Nightrunner series, a multi-part fantasy series written by Lynn Flewelling
 Nightrunner (character), a fictional character created for publisher DC Comics
 The Night Runner, a 1957 film directed by Abner Biberman
Nightrunners of Bengal, a novel by John Masters
 Night Runner, a type of Skaven unit in Warhammer

See also
 "Runner in the Night", a song performed by the sextet Ryder at the 1986 Eurovision Song Contest